Clearlight is an American instrumental rock band from New Orleans, Louisiana. They are also known as the Mystick Krewe of Clearlight due to other bands using the same original name.

History
The Mystick Krewe of Clearlight was founded in 1996 as an instrumental side-project by members of New Orleans bands Eyehategod, Down, and Crowbar. This project has allowed the members to explore music outside their native metal genre. After several years of shows in New Orleans with the occasional out-of-town show they recorded their self-titled debut album via Tee Pee Records in 2000. This was followed by The Father, the Son and the Holy Smoke, a 2001 split release with Acid King on Man's Ruin Records, featuring Scott "Wino" Weinrich (the Obsessed, Saint Vitus, Spirit Caravan, the Hidden Hand) on vocals. That same year they released a split 7-inch with the Obsessed that features both bands covering Lynyrd Skynyrd. The Mystick Krewe covers "Cheatin Woman" and features Pepper Keenan of Corrosion of Conformity on vocals. They have also been featured on compilations such as Inhale and High Volume: The Stoner Rock Collection.

Members
Jimmy Bower – guitar
Paul Webb – guitar
Andy Shepherd – bass
Joey Lacaze – drums
Ross Karpelman – electric organ

Discography

Albums
The Mystick Krewe of Clearlight LP/CD (2000 Tee Pee Records)
The Father, the Son and the Holy Smoke split CD with Acid King (2001 Man's Ruin Records)

Singles
Split 7-inch with The Obsessed (both sides are Lynyrd Skynyrd covers) (2001)

Compilation tracks
"Railhead" on Inhale CD (2000 Spitfire Records)
"Electrode" on Guerrilla Jukebox Vol 1 CD (2003 Tee Pee Records)
"Ride Out" on High Volume: The Stoner Rock Collection CD (2004 High Times Records)

References

External links 
 Tee Pee Records
 NOLA Underground

Heavy metal musical groups from Louisiana
Musical groups established in 1996
Musical groups disestablished in 2001
Musical groups from New Orleans